Wilden may refer to:

Wilden, Bedfordshire, a village and civil parish in Bedfordshire, England
Wilden, Worcestershire, a village and civil parish in Worcestershire, England